James Benner Juvenal (January 12, 1874 – September 1, 1942) was an American rower, born in Philadelphia, who competed in the 1900 Summer Olympics and in the 1904 Summer Olympics.

Juvenal began rowing when he was 19 years old and won his first race in 1893. He won the Middle States regatta in Scranton, Pennsylvania rowing in an aluminum shell which was reportedly the first time this type of boat was used in competition.

In 1900, he was part of the American boat from the Vesper Boat Club, which won the gold medal in the men's eight. Four years later, he won the silver medal in the single sculls.

He won over 100 races between 1893 and 1906 including the 1902 National Association single sculls championship and six consecutive championships of the Schuykill Navy.

He became a professional rowing coach in 1906 and worked with Malta Boat Club and Penn Barge Club.

He worked at the Philadelphia Electric Company for over 40 years.

He died on September 1, 1942 and was interred at Laurel Hill Cemetery in Philadelphia.

References

External links
 
 
 

1874 births
1942 deaths
American male rowers
Burials at Laurel Hill Cemetery (Philadelphia)
Medalists at the 1900 Summer Olympics
Medalists at the 1904 Summer Olympics
Olympic gold medalists for the United States in rowing
Olympic silver medalists for the United States in rowing
Rowers at the 1900 Summer Olympics
Rowers at the 1904 Summer Olympics
Rowers from Philadelphia
Rowing coaches